Alexander Johnson (born 10 April 1969) is an Australian former modern pentathlete. He competed in the men's individual event at the 1996 Summer Olympics.

References

External links
 

1969 births
Living people
Australian male modern pentathletes
Olympic modern pentathletes of Australia
Modern pentathletes at the 1996 Summer Olympics
Sportspeople from Brisbane
20th-century Australian people
21st-century Australian people